St Augustine's Church is a Roman Catholic parish church in Darlington, County Durham. The church was built in 1827 to a design by Ignatius Bonomi, was enlarged and remodelled by Joseph Hansom in 1865, and is a Grade II listed building.

References

Grade II listed churches in County Durham
Roman Catholic churches in County Durham
Roman Catholic churches completed in 1827
Grade II listed Roman Catholic churches in England
1827 establishments in England
Churches in Darlington
19th-century Roman Catholic church buildings in the United Kingdom